Ashland District School is located in Ashland, Maine, United States. It is part of  Maine School Administrative District 32, or MSAD 32, which serves Ashland, Garfield Plantation, Masardis, Oxbow, Portage Lake, and Sheridan, Maine.  There is a student population of approximately 320 from school grades Pre-K–12, with fifty-six faculty members as well as administrators, a counselor and three support personnel.  The school had achieved accredited status with the New England Association of Schools and Colleges.

Sports programs offered at Ashland District School include: baseball, basketball, cheering, cross country, golf, softball, and soccer. The school's teams are known as the Ashland Hornets.

History
Ashland District School was designed by Lewis & Malm Architecture of Bucksport, Maine, residing where the old soccer and baseball/softball fields used to be. Construction began on August 19, 2008, and completed just in time for the 2010–2011 school year. A public open house was held on September 1, 2010, and week later opened to students for the first day of school on September 8, 2010. The new lighted soccer and baseball/softball fields are adjacent to the school where the Ashland Community High School used to be.

References

Official site

Public high schools in Maine
Schools in Aroostook County, Maine
Public middle schools in Maine
Public elementary schools in Maine